Pope Liberius (310 – 24 September 366) was the bishop of Rome from 17 May 352 until his death. According to the Catalogus Liberianus, he was consecrated on 22 May as the successor to Pope Julius I. He is not mentioned as a saint in the Roman Martyrology.   That makes him the earliest pontiff not to be venerated as a saint in the Roman Rite and one of only two popes to be omitted from Roman Catholic sainthood in the first 500 years of church history.  (Pope Anastasius II is the second.)  

Liberius is mentioned in the Greek Menology, the Eastern equivalent to the martyrologies of the Western Church and a measure of sainthood prior to the institution of the formal Western processes of canonization.

Pontificate
The first recorded act of Liberius was, after a synod had been held at Rome, to write to Emperor Constantius II, then in quarters at Arles (353–354), asking that a council might be called at Aquileia with reference to the affairs of Athanasius of Alexandria, but his messenger Vincentius of Capua was compelled by the emperor at a conciliabulum held in Arles to subscribe against his will to a condemnation of the orthodox patriarch of Alexandria.

Constantius was sympathetic to the Arians, and when he could not persuade Liberius to his point of view sent the pope to a prison in Beroea. At the end of an exile of more than two years in Thrace, after which it seems he may have temporarily relented, or been set up to appear to have relented – partially evidenced by three letters, quite possibly forgeries, ascribed to Liberius, the emperor recalled him under extreme pressure from the Roman population who refused to recognize his puppet, Felix II.  As the Roman See was "officially" occupied by Felix, a year passed before Liberius was sent to Rome. It was the emperor's intention that Liberius should govern the Church jointly with Felix, but on the arrival of Liberius, Felix was expelled by the Roman people. Neither Liberius nor Felix took part in the Council of Rimini (359).

After the death of the Emperor Constantius in 361, Liberius annulled the decrees of that assembly but, with the concurrence of bishops Athanasius and Hilary of Poitiers, retained the bishops who had signed and then withdrew their adherence. In 366, Liberius gave a favourable reception to a deputation of the Eastern episcopate, and admitted into his communion the more moderate of the old Arian party. He died on 24 September 366.

Some historians have postulated that Liberius resigned the papacy in 365, in order to make sense of the pontificate of Felix II, who has since been regarded as an antipope.
That view is overwhelmingly outnumbered by the writings of historians and scholars which document Liberius' staunch orthodoxy through the end of his pontificate ended by his death.

Legacy

Pope Pius IX noted in Quartus Supra that Liberius was falsely accused by the Arians and he had refused to condemn Athanasius of Alexandria. In his encyclical Principi Apostolorum Petro, Pope Benedict XV noted that Pope Liberius went fearlessly into exile in defence of the orthodox faith.

In the Eastern Orthodox Church, Liberius is a saint whose feast is celebrated on 27 August. In Coptic Christianity, the Departure of St Liberius the Bishop of Rome is commemorated on 4 Pi Kogi Enavot.

The Basilica di Santa Maria Maggiore in Rome is sometimes referred to as the Liberian Basilica.

Notes

Sources

References

External links

 Translation of Jaffe-Kaltenbrunner's Register of the Roman Pontiff.
 Theodoret of Cyrus' record of his confrontation with the Emperor over Athanasius from his Ecclesiastical History.

310 births
366 deaths
4th-century Romans
Popes
4th-century popes